The Lola T260 is a Group 7 sports prototype race car, designed, developed, and built by the British manufacturer and constructor Lola, under the leadership and guidance of Eric Broadley, to compete in the North American Can-Am championship from the 1971 season.

References

Sports prototypes
T260
Can-Am cars